The 1989 Buffalo Bills season was the franchise's 30th overall season as a football team and the 20th in the National Football League.  The Bills finished in first place in the AFC East and finished the National Football League's 1989 season with a record of 9 wins and 7 losses. Although Buffalo won the division and qualified for the postseason, their record was a drop off from their 12–4 mark in 1988.

Bickering Bills

The team was nicknamed the Bickering Bills because of a rash of internal conflicts within the team. During a Monday Night loss to the Denver Broncos, star quarterback Jim Kelly could be seen arguing with wide receiver Chris Burkett, which led to the latter's last game with the team, as he was released shortly after the game.

Kelly was injured in a Week 5 blowout loss to the Indianapolis Colts and subsequently blamed his offensive line's blocking, notably offensive tackle Howard Ballard, for contributing to his injury.

In the week leading up to a Week 8 matchup with Miami, assistant coaches Tom Bresnahan and Nick Nicolau got into a fistfight while the two were reviewing game film.

The biggest blowup occurred when starting running back Thurman Thomas, asking to address Jim Kelly's criticism of the offense, and the pass-catching ability of running back Ronnie Harmon in particular, criticized Kelly himself on a Rochester, New York television show. When asked what position the Bills could upgrade at, Thomas replied, "Quarterback." Thomas claimed at first that it was a joke, but later, when appearing on Paul Maguire's Budweiser Sportsline show, he stated that the team didn't appreciate Kelly's public criticism and that Kelly should elevate his level of play.

Offseason

NFL draft

Unable to select a first or second-round pick in the 1989 draft, the Bills were able to pick wide receiver Don Beebe.  Beebe was a third-round pick from small Chadron State.  He would be a productive wide receiver for the team for six seasons. Beebe would achieve something akin to folk hero status in Buffalo, when, in Super Bowl XXVII, as the Bills were being soundly defeated by Dallas, Beebe chased down Cowboys defensive tackle Leon Lett, stripped the ball from his hands and saved what would have been a sure touchdown.

The Bills also drafted future two-sport athlete Brian Jordan in the seventh round. Though the Bills cut him before the 1989 season began, Jordan would go on to play three productive seasons for the Atlanta Falcons, and fifteen seasons as a Major League Baseball outfielder.

Supplemental draft

Personnel

Staff

Roster

Regular season
Before the season, future Hall of Fame defensive end Bruce Smith was offered a large contract by Denver (US$7.5 million over five years), one that the Bills chose to match to retain Smith. In 1989, Smith became the Bills' all-time sack leader when he reached his 52nd sack; he would end his 19-year career with 200, the most of any NFL player all-time.

Despite the internal strife the Bills experienced, they had some memorable wins.  The Bills started the season with a last-second victory at Miami. The Dolphins led 24–13 in the fourth but Buffalo scored on a Flip Johnson touchdown catch, then with two seconds left on the clock, quarterback Jim Kelly dropped back to pass, but ran the ball in to the end zone as time expired, securing a 27–24 win.

In Week Three, the Bills traveled to the Houston Astrodome and faced the "Run, and Shoot" Oilers.  The Bills raced to a 27–10 lead in the third, but the Oilers exploded and the two teams combined for 45 points to force overtime.  In overtime, a missed Tony Zendejas kick allowed the Bills to win on Jim Kelly's 28-yard score to Andre Reed.   The 47–41 win would become the highest-scoring game between the two franchises.  Kelly finished with five touchdown throws.

In Week Six the Bills hosted the undefeated Los Angeles Rams, with backup quarterback Frank Reich subbing for an injured Jim Kelly. The two clubs combined for 26 fourth-quarter points, and with 77 seconds remaining Reich started a drive from the Buffalo 36 yard line and with sixteen seconds left Andre Reed caught the winning eight-yard touchdown.

In Week Thirteen, on Monday Night Football, the Bills lost to the Seattle Seahawks 17–16, which included Seahawk Steve Largent running in a botched extra-point attempt.   Dave Krieg's 51-yard touchdown in the fourth was ultimately the 1-point difference.

The Bills then lost their next two games (to the Saints and 49ers) before securing the AFC East title with a shutout road win over the New York Jets.

Schedule

Game summaries

Week 1

Week 2

   

The Bills lost on Monday Night Football 28–14, giving up a safety when Jamie Mueller was downed in the Bills endzone in the first quarter.   It never got better as Jim Kelly was intercepted three times by the Broncos.   John Elway and four Broncos backs rushed for 201 yards and won despite ten penalties for 71 yards.  Kelly got into a confrontation with receiver Chris Burkett.  In the game, Burkett had only one catch for six yards; Burkett was cut and quickly signed by the Jets.

Week 3

   

The Bills traveled to the Astrodome and the ensuing game against the Oilers became the highest-scoring meeting in the two clubs' history.  With Buffalo up 13–10 on the final play of the second quarter a blocked Oilers field goal attempt was run back for a 76-yard Bills touchdown by Mark Kelso.  The Bills clawed to a 27–10 lead but the Oilers scored two quick touchdowns in the third, the second a Cris Dishman score on a blocked punt.  Warren Moon was drilled as he rifled a touchdown to Ernest Givens and Givens literally jumped over three Bills defenders as he landed in the endzone; a Kelly interception led to a Lorenzo White score, but after a Thurman Thomas touchdown and the overturning of a Bills pick-six, Moon drove down for Tony Zendejas's game-tying 52-yard field goal.  Zendejas missed another kick in overtime, and Kelly's 28-yard strike to Andre Reed ended the game, a 47–41 overtime Bills win.

Week 6

Week 8

Week 9

This would be the final win of the season for Atlanta.

Week 10

Week 11

Week 12

Bills first win vs Bengals since 09/11/1983

Week 14

The Bills had the chance to clinch the AFC Eastern Title this game.
John Fourcade was the named starter for the Saints ahead of Bobby Hebert.

Week 15

    
    
    
    

For the second week in a row, the Bills had the chance to clinch the AFC Eastern Division title with a win.
The 49ers sat Joe Montana as they clinched all they needed the prior week, therefore, backup Steve Young was the starter for San Francisco in this game.

Week 16

Bills clinch AFC Eastern Division title with the win.

Standings

Playoffs

AFC Divisional Playoff
Buffalo Bills (9–7) at Cleveland Browns (9–6–1)

In a shootout, Browns linebacker Clay Matthews intercepted Bills quarterback Jim Kelly at the Cleveland 1-yard line with 3 seconds remaining to preserve a 34–30 victory. Kelly threw for 405 yards and 4 touchdowns while Browns quarterback Bernie Kosar threw for 251 yards and 3 touchdowns with no interceptions. Browns receiver Webster Slaughter had the best postseason performance of his career with 3 receptions for 114 yards and 2 touchdowns.

Buffalo scored first with wide receiver Andre Reed's 72-yard touchdown reception. But Cleveland struck back with a 45-yard field goal by Matt Bahr and a 52-yard touchdown pass from Kosar to Slaughter.  Kelly's 33-yard touchdown pass to James Lofton put the Bills back in the lead, 14–10, but Browns retook the lead with Ron Middleton's 3-yard catch shortly before the end of the first half.

On the opening drive of the second half, Kosar hooked up with Slaughter for another touchdown pass, this one 44-yards, to increase their lead to 24–14.  Buffalo responded with a 6-yard touchdown catch by running back Thurman Thomas, who tied an NFL playoff record with 13 receptions for 150 yards.  But Browns running back Eric Metcalf returned the ensuing kickoff 90 yards for a touchdown to give his team a 31–21 lead by the end of the third quarter. After an exchange of field goals, Thomas caught a three-yard touchdown pass. But the extra point failed, forcing the Bills to attempt to score a touchdown instead of a field goal on their final drive.  With time running out, Kelly led the Bills to Cleveland's 11-yard line, but halfback Ronnie Harmon dropped a potential game-winning catch in the end zone, and Matthews intercepted Kelly on the next play.

Awards and records
 Shane Conlan, Pro Bowl Selection
 Kent Hull, Pro Bowl Selection
 Bruce Smith, Pro Bowl Selection
 Thurman Thomas, Pro Bowl Selection
 Thurman Thomas, NFL Combined Yards from Scrimmage Leader

See also
List of NFL teams affected by internal conflict

References

External links
1989 Buffalo Bills at Pro-Football-Reference.com

Buffalo Bills
AFC East championship seasons
Buffalo Bills seasons
Buff